Theodore Sougiannis is an American economist, currently the KPMG Distinguished Professor of Accountancy at Gies College of Business, University of Illinois.

References

Year of birth missing (living people)
Living people
University of Illinois faculty
American accountants
American economists
University of California, Berkeley alumni
Place of birth missing (living people)